Ekmanis (feminine: Ekmane) is a Latvian surname of German origin (from the German surname Eckmann). Individuals with the surname include:

Juris Ekmanis (1941–2016), Latvian physicist, former President of Latvian Academy of Sciences 
Zintis Ekmanis (born 1958), Latvian bobsledder

Latvian-language masculine surnames